Asgeir Dølplads (born 26 August 1932) is a Norwegian former ski jumper.

On 1 January 1953 he became the first ever winner of the Garmisch-Partenkirchen New Year's ski jump competition, an integral part of the Four Hills Tournament. With jumps of 78.5 and 81 metres, Dølplads won ahead of Austrian Sepp Bradl and German Toni Brutscher. In the ensuing competitions in Oberstdorf, Innsbruck and Bischofshofen, Dølplads was ranked 3, 2, and 7, landing him an overall 3rd prize, after Bradl and fellow Norwegian Halvor Næs. 

He represented Rena IL and Stabæk IF during his career.

Dølplads has been actively involved in recruitment to ski jumping at and around Rena, where Rena IL operates one of Norway's leading K120 ski jumping hills.

He is the father-in-law of popular Norwegian comedian Atle Antonsen.

References

1932 births
Living people
Norwegian male ski jumpers
20th-century Norwegian people